The Knoxville Giants were a Negro league baseball professional team based in Knoxville, Tennessee between 1920 and 1932. The Knoxville Giants were a member of the Negro Southern League from 1920 to 1922 and 1931 to 1932.

History 
The Knoxville Giants began play in the 1920 Negro Southern League as charter members of the eight–team league.

In 1920, the Knoxville Giants finished 2nd or 1st in the Negro Southern League depending on the source. They are reported as finishing 55–21 (1st) and 34–30 (2nd). The Giants had a 14–game winning streak during the season. Newspaper articles referred to the Knoxville Giants as the 1920 champions.

It was noted that Knoxville, in the era of segregated baseball, had an integrated fan base, often drawing 1,000–1,500 fans.

The Knoxville Giants finished 8th at 43–79 in the 1921 Negro Southern League standings.

In 1922, the Knoxville Giants finished 44–27, placing 2nd in the Negro Southern League. The Giants were 3.0 games behind the Nashville Elite Giants and 1.5 games ahead of the Memphis Red Sox in the final standings.

The Knoxville Giants rejoined the six–team Negro Southern League in 1931. The 1931 Knoxville Giants finished in 6th place with an 11–19 record, finishing behind the 1st place Nashville Elite Giants in the final standings.

In 1932, Knoxville did not play as a league member, with the Negro Southern League  having expanded to eight–teams after the folding of the Negro National League. Knoxville is believed to have played as one of four teams that were an associate member of the 1932 Negro Southern League, playing games against league members, while not being an official member of the league.

The ballpark 
The Knoxville Giants played at Booker T. Washington Park. Booker T. Washington Park had previously been known as "Brewer's Park." The ballpark was located in East Knoxville.

Notable players 
Steel Arm Dickey (1920)
Forest “Wing” Maddox (1920–1922) Maddox had one arm
 Harry Salmon (1922)

References

External links
Negro Southern League Museum
Giants Photos
Knoxville Giants Player Photos

Negro league baseball teams
Sports in Knoxville, Tennessee
Baseball teams disestablished in 1932
Baseball teams established in 1920
Defunct baseball teams in Tennessee
Professional baseball teams in Tennessee